The Colt Automatic Rifle or Colt Light Machine Gun is a 5.56 mm NATO, open-bolt, full-automatic-only firearm developed by Colt Defense.  It is based on the M16A2/A4, and has a distinctive squared-off handguard, vertical grip, carrying handle and integrated bipod.

It is one of many squad automatic weapon-type firearms that have been developed from the Armalite AR-15 that use the Stoner bolt and carrier piston system.  The family name was derived from the original AR-15 by adding "Colt", resulting in the CAR-15, to stand for Colt Automatic Rifle, even though the "AR" in AR-15 stands for Armalite Rifle, the original manufacturer. The CAR-15 weapons system consisted of the AR-15 and five variations, including the Colt Machine Gun and CAR-15 Heavy Assault Rifle.

Overview
The Colt Automatic Rifle is the name of a current product, but Colt has developed a number of similar weapons since the company obtained the rights to produce the Armalite AR-15 family at the end of the 1950s. Originally known as the Colt M16 LMG or simply as the Colt LMG (Light Machine Gun), this weapon was developed as a joint venture by Colt and Diemaco, a Canadian firm licensed by Colt in 1982 to produce variants of the M16 family for the Canadian Armed Forces. In 2005, Diemaco was acquired by Colt's Manufacturing LLC and renamed Colt Canada.

The Colt/Diemaco weapon traces its lineage to a number of weapons developed both at Colt and by the U.S. military. These weapons were all designed to fill the role of the earlier Browning Automatic Rifle. The BAR was originally to have been replaced by the M15 Squad Automatic Weapon, but instead was ultimately replaced by the M16A1; one rifleman was supposed to use this weapon's fully automatic setting while the rest of the squad used semi-automatic. Throughout the period between the introduction of the M16 and the introduction of the M249 as a purpose-built squad automatic weapon at the end of the SAW trials, interim weapons were developed and tested in order to fill the gap.

Colt Model 606 CAR-15 Heavy Assault Rifle M1

Colt made a version of the M16 with a heavier barrel for sustained automatic fire. Along with a bipod, it weighed a pound more than a normal M16. The Army purchased less than 200 for use in the Small Arms Weapons System (SAWS) program.

WAK "Interim SAW" and the BRL XM106

At the request of the United States Marine Corps, WAK Inc. started work on an "Interim SAW" in 1977. This was to provide a more solid automatic rifle to replace the practice of the automatic rifleman switching his weapon to full-auto, and to provide this capability until the US Army's SAW trials had been completed. The WAK SAW was essentially an M16A1 converted to fire from an open bolt, accompanied by a special buffer, and featuring a specially-made compensator. In 1978 the US Army's Ballistic Research Laboratory (BRL) decided to build on the WAK concept to create a contender for the SAW trials, designated XM106. The BRL gun differed primarily in having permanently fixed handguards and a special quick-change barrel system. The handguards also had an M2 bipod originally for the M14 rifle and a vertical foregrip fashioned from an M16A1 pistol grip. Early XM106s also had the front sight moved forward along the barrel to create a longer sight radius for more accurate long range fire, but this was dropped from later versions. In the end the Army used the XM106 as a control variable during the competition and instead selected the M249 Squad Automatic Weapon.

Colt/Diemaco LMG

During the 1980s Colt decided to expand on the basic ideas that had been developed in the WAK and BRL guns. The weapon was essentially a modified M16A1 with a new square handguard to cover the enlarged straight gas tube and almost 1 inch thick heavy barrel to make the barrel less susceptible for overheating and hence increase the sustained or effective rate of fire capability, a carry handle on top of the handguard, with a hydraulic buffer assembly and the ability to fire from an open bolt. The chrome-lined barrel was permanently fixed to the receiver and could not be replaced in the field. An angled foregrip was added to the handguard to improve handling as an automatic rifle. Rear sights later featured on the M16A2 were also introduced, and the weapon could only fire in fully automatic firing mode. Unlike many M16 variants, it fired from an open bolt, necessitating the removal of the forward assist for operating safety. Colt initially packaged these weapons with the MWG 90-round "snail drum" (later replaced with the Beta Systems C-Mag). Colt had also originally used the M60 machine gun bipod, but switched this to a proprietary design that was lighter for the subsequent Model 750.

The Colt Model 750 was an improvement of the basic principle of the Colt LMG, developed jointly by Colt and Diemaco with an eye to Canadian Army sales. The improved version featured all A2 parts and is essentially the same as the preceding variant externally except for the redesigned vertical foregrip, now of a ribbed straight cylindrical style. This weapon was marketed by Diemaco as the C7 Light Support Weapon (LSW) or simply as the LSW. The Netherlands Marine Corps designate it as "LOAW" (licht ondersteunend automatisch wapen/light supporting automatic weapon) and the Danish military as "LSV M/04". The LSWs used by the Netherlands Marine Corps and the Danish military like many M16 variants fire from a closed bolt and feature semi-automatic and fully automatic firing modes and a forward assist. With its 5.42 kg (14.5 lbs) the C7 LSW is relatively light and as it uses 5.56×45mm NATO ammunition fed from STANAG magazines, like assault rifles and carbines that are fed in the same way, ammunition is easy to redistribute between riflemen if the operator runs out of ammunition. The lack of belt feed and quick barrel change options limits the C7 LSW and similar magazine fed light support weapon's rapid rates of fire.

Colt and Diemaco further improved on the design, adding a flat top carry handle and a further improved bipod to the weapon in the 1990s. Colt refers to it as the Model 950, but markets it as the Colt Automatic Rifle, and until their purchase by Colt, as the Diemaco LSW. Because of the Colt-Diemaco partnership on this system, it was the only weapon in the Diemaco product line to feature M16A2-type range and windage adjustable rear sights, and when modified a detachable carry handle with M16A2 fully adjustable rear sights (the majority of Diemaco's product line had modified M16A1-type rear sights, and they actually developed a detachable carry handle with modified A1 rear sights). A maple leaf is stamped on the lower receiver of current Colt Automatic Rifles.

From 2009 onwards many of the Dutch LOAW purchased in 1994 have had an overhaul: the black furniture has now been replaced by dark earth furniture. New parts include a new retracting stock, ambidextrous controls, an Integrated Upper Receiver (IUR) with a free-floating barrel and RIS rails for mounting Laser Light Modules and other accessories. The ELCAN 3.4×28 optical sight has also disappeared in favour of the Swedish made Aimpoint CompM4 red dot sight and, if desired, an accompanying Aimpoint magnifier. The polymer STANAG compliant magazines became not exclusively black in color as translucent smoke colored Lancer L5AWM 30-round magazines (NSN: 1005-01-657-7839L5) were also introduced along the black Thermold magazines. This upgraded version is now known as "LOAWNLD".

Users

: Replaced by Ultimax 100.
: C7 Light Support Weapon designated as LSV M/04 
: C7 Light Support Weapon designated as LOAW(NLD) — Used by the Netherlands Marine Corps.

See also
 Colt AR-15
 CAR-15 Heavy Assault Rifle M2 (AKA: Colt Machine Gun)
 Colt MARS
 M27 IAR
 RPK
 Squad Automatic Weapon
 Comparison of the AK-47 and M16

References

External links

 Colt Defense Weapons Systems - Colt Automatic Rifle (2003)
 Colt Canada - Light Support Weapon (2018) 
 "The Colt LMG", Bartocci, Christopher R., Small Arms Defense Journal, 19 August 2011
 Images of Diemaco C7 LSW arms and in Dutch service

Colt rifles
5.56×45mm NATO machine guns
Squad automatic weapons
Automatic rifles
ArmaLite AR-10 derivatives
Weapons and ammunition introduced in 1994